Daniela Ciobanu (born 9 March 1995) is an inactive Moldovan tennis player.

She has a career-high singles ranking of world No. 710, achieved on 15 June 2015.

Ciobanu represents Moldova in the Fed Cup where she has an overall win–loss record of 8–14.

ITF finals

Singles (0–1)

Doubles (1–2)

ITF Junior Circuit finals

Singles (0–3)

Doubles (1–3)

References

External links
 
 
 

1995 births
Living people
Moldovan female tennis players